Dida may refer to:

People

Sports

Football
Dida (footballer, born 1934) (1934–2002), born Edvaldo Alves de Santa Rosa, Brazilian forward
Dida (footballer, born 1973), born Nélson de Jesus Silva, Brazilian goalkeeper
Dida (footballer, born 1979), born Eduardo Gabriel dos Santos Filho, Brazilian rightback
Dida (footballer, born 1991), born Ana Lúcia Nascimento dos Santos, Brazilian female goalkeeper

Other sports
Dida Diafat (born 1970), French kickboxer
Andre Dida (born 1983), born Andre Shervniski Amado, Brazilian mixed martial artist

Politics
Dida of Eynsham, a 7th-century Mercian King

Entertainment
DiDa Ritz, American drag queen

Other uses
Dida language, a Kru language, or two languages, spoken in Côte d'Ivoire
DiDA, the Diploma in Digital Applications
Drug Industry Document Archive, the Drug Industry Document Archive at the University of California, San Francisco, Library
"Dida", a song by Joan Baez from her 1974 album Gracias a la Vida
Dida (moth), a genus of moths of the family Erebidae